BRP can mean:
 Basic Role-Playing game system
 Biometric Residence Permit, a type of card in lieu of visa which allows a non-British citizen to work & reside in the UK.
 Blue Ridge Parkway
 Bombardier Recreational Products, Canadian company
 Brief reactive psychosis
 British Racing Partnership, former British motor racing team
 Bathroom privileges
 Bronx River Parkway in New York
 Brotherhood of Russian Truth (Bratstvo Russkoy Pravdy), former Russian emigrant organization
 Barko/Bapor ng Republika ng Pilipinas (ship/steamship of the Republic of the Philippines), Philippine Coast Guard, Philippine Navy, and other government-owned ship name prefix
 "B.R.P.", song by Victor Jara on album El derecho de vivir en paz
 Brioche-purl stitch, in brioche knitting
 Birpara, a town in West Bengal, India